Bobby Kiranbir Singh (born 27 September 1998) is a Hong Kong professional footballer of Indian descent who currently plays as a forward for Hong Kong Premier League club Sham Shui Po.

Career statistics

Club

Notes

References

Living people
1998 births
Hong Kong footballers
Indian footballers
Hong Kong people of Indian descent
Association football forwards
Hong Kong First Division League players
Hong Kong Premier League players
Metro Gallery FC players
TSW Pegasus FC players
Yuen Long FC players
Sham Shui Po SA players